"Broken Down Angel" is a song and single by Scottish rock group Nazareth. It was first released in 1973.

Background
The song features Dan McCafferty on lead vocals, Darrell Sweet on percussion, Pete Agnew on bass guitar and Manny Charlton on electric guitar. They wrote the track collectively. It was taken from their 1973 album Razamanaz, and proved to be popular on their tours undertaken in 1973. The same year it was featured on a live album, BBC Radio 1 Live in Concert.
The song was the first of eleven of Nazareth's singles to appear in the UK Singles Chart. It reached 9 in 1973, staying on the chart for 11 weeks.

Charts

References

1973 songs
1973 singles
Nazareth (band) songs
Song recordings produced by Roger Glover
Mooncrest Records singles
Songs written by Dan McCafferty
Songs written by Darrell Sweet (musician)
Songs written by Manny Charlton